Rajadhiraj Karan Chand Singh Baba (born 29 March 1947) is current Maharaja of Kumaon also an Indian politician who was a member of the 14th and 15th Lok Sabha of the Parliament of India. He represented the Nainital-Udhamsingh Nagar constituency of Uttarakhand and is a member of the Indian National Congress (INC) political party.

He is a graduate of St.Joseph's College in Nainital. Currently he stays in Kashipur Fort, Kashipur.

Positions held
 1986 Chairman, Nagar Palika, Kashipur
 1989 - 1991 & 1996 - 2002 Member, Uttar Pradesh Legislative Assembly (two terms)
 2004 Elected to 14th Lok Sabha Member, Committee on Science and Technology, Environment and Forests
 5 Aug. 2007 Member, Committee on Science & Technology, Environment & Forests
 1 May 2008 Member, Committee on Public Undertakings
 2009 Re-elected to 15th Lok Sabha (2nd term)
 6 Aug. 2009 Member, Committee on Public Undertakings
 31 Aug. 2009 Member, Committee on Agriculture
 1 May 2010 Member, Committee, Science & Technology, Environment & Forests Member, Committee on Sports.

Sports and Clubs
Uttar Pradesh Power Lifting Champion (five times),
Winner of strongest Man of U.P. and Best Lifter Award;
Two times National Power Lifting Champion,
Held national records in Bench Press;
Asia Championship; won two Silver and two Bronze Medals;
Member of the Indian National Team that won the Asian Championship held in Indonesia, 1984.

References

External links
 Official biographical sketch in Parliament of India website

1947 births
Living people
Indian National Congress politicians from Uttar Pradesh
India MPs 2004–2009
Members of the Uttar Pradesh Legislative Assembly
People from Nainital
India MPs 2009–2014
Lok Sabha members from Uttarakhand
United Progressive Alliance candidates in the 2014 Indian general election
Uttarakhand politicians
All India Indira Congress (Tiwari) politicians
People from Udham Singh Nagar district